Tadini was an Italian itinerant ophthalmologist who lived in the second half of the 18th century. Advertisements in old newspapers testify to the fact that he performed eye operations in many towns in Europe, including Lübeck and Ghent. Tadini had a box containing artificial lenses made of glass, which he showed to Giacomo Casanova. It is therefore probable that Tadini first conceived the idea of intraocular correction of aphakia. Presumably Casanova conveyed the idea to Casaamata, an ophthalmic surgeon in Dresden. At any rate, Casaamata was the first to actually attempt the correction of aphakia by implanting a lens.

References

Italian ophthalmologists
Year of birth unknown
Year of death unknown
18th-century Italian physicians